The 2022 Denmark Open (officially known as the Denmark Open 2022 presented by VICTOR for sponsorship reasons) was a badminton tournament which took place at the Arena Fyn in Odense, Denmark, from 18 to 23 October 2022 and had a total prize of US$750,000.

The host country Denmark failed to send any representatives in the tournament's semi-finals for the first time ever.

Tournament 
The 2022 Denmark Open was the seventeenth tournament according to the 2022 BWF World Tour. It was a part of the Denmark Open, which had been held since 1935. This tournament was organized by Badminton Denmark with sanction from the BWF.

Venue 
This international tournament was held at the Arena Fyn in Odense, Denmark.

Point distribution 
Below is the point distribution table for each phase of the tournament based on the BWF points system for the BWF World Tour Super 750 event.

Prize money 
The total prize money for this tournament was US$750,000. Distribution of prize money was in accordance with BWF regulations.

Men's singles

Seeds 

 Viktor Axelsen (quarter-finals)
 Kento Momota (withdrew)
 Anders Antonsen (withdrew)
 Lee Zii Jia (final)
 Chou Tien-chen (quarter-finals)
 Anthony Sinisuka Ginting (first round)
 Loh Kean Yew (semi-finals)
 Jonatan Christie (quarter-finals)

Finals

Top half

Section 1

Section 2

Bottom half

Section 3

Section 4

Women's singles

Seeds 

 Akane Yamaguchi (quarter-finals)
 Tai Tzu-ying (quarter-finals)
 Chen Yufei (final)
 Carolina Marín (second round)
 Ratchanok Intanon (semi-finals)
 Nozomi Okuhara (second round)
 Pornpawee Chochuwong (quarter-finals)
 He Bingjiao (champion)

Finals

Top half

Section 1

Section 2

Bottom half

Section 3

Section 4

Men's doubles

Seeds 

 Takuro Hoki / Yugo Kobayashi (first round)
 Marcus Fernaldi Gideon / Kevin Sanjaya Sukamuljo (final)
 Mohammad Ahsan / Hendra Setiawan (second round)
 Aaron Chia / Soh Wooi Yik (semi-finals)
 Fajar Alfian / Muhammad Rian Ardianto (champions)
 Kim Astrup / Anders Skaarup Rasmussen (first round)
 Satwiksairaj Rankireddy / Chirag Shetty (quarter-finals)
 Ong Yew Sin / Teo Ee Yi (semi-finals)

Finals

Top half

Section 1

Section 2

Bottom half

Section 3

Section 4

Women's doubles

Seeds 

 Chen Qingchen / Jia Yifan (champions)
 Kim So-yeong / Kong Hee-yong (quarter-finals)
 Nami Matsuyama / Chiharu Shida (semi-finals)
 Yuki Fukushima / Sayaka Hirota (quarter-finals)
 Mayu Matsumoto / Wakana Nagahara (first round)
 Jongkolphan Kititharakul / Rawinda Prajongjai (semi-finals)
 Apriyani Rahayu / Siti Fadia Silva Ramadhanti (quarter-finals)
 Jeong Na-eun / Kim Hye-jeong (first round)

Finals

Top half

Section 1

Section 2

Bottom half

Section 3

Section 4

Mixed doubles

Seeds 

 Dechapol Puavaranukroh / Sapsiree Taerattanachai (second round)
 Yuta Watanabe / Arisa Higashino (quarter-finals) 
 Zheng Siwei / Huang Yaqiong (champions)
 Seo Seung-jae / Chae Yoo-jung (quarter-finals)
 Tang Chun Man / Tse Ying Suet (withdrew)
 Thom Gicquel / Delphine Delrue (quarter-finals)
 Mark Lamsfuß / Isabel Lohau (second round)
 Tan Kian Meng / Lai Pei Jing (second round)

Finals

Top half

Section 1

Section 2

Bottom half

Section 3

Section 4

References

External links 
Tournament link
Official website

Denmark Open
Denmark Open
Denmark Open
Denmark Open